The 1989 UEFA Cup Final was an association football tie played on 3 May 1989 and 17 May 1989 between Napoli of Italy and Stuttgart of West Germany. Captained by Diego Maradona, Napoli won the two-legged final 5–4 on aggregate to win their first major European honour.

Route to the final

Match details

First leg

Second leg

See also
1988–89 UEFA Cup
1989 European Cup Final
1989 European Cup Winners' Cup Final
S.S.C. Napoli in European football

References
RSSSF

2
S.S.C. Napoli matches
VfB Stuttgart matches
1989
International club association football competitions hosted by Germany
International club association football competitions hosted by Italy
1988–89 in German football
1988–89 in Italian football
May 1989 sports events in Europe
1980s in Baden-Württemberg
20th century in Stuttgart
Sports competitions in Stuttgart
Sports competitions in Naples
Football in Naples
20th century in Naples